Severus Sanctus Endelechius (or Endelechus) was a 4th century poet and rhetorician, and the writer of De Mortibus Boum (or Bovum), i.e. On the Deaths of Cattle.

It is a poem belonging to the classical bucolic tradition, but also concerned with Christian apologetics. It mentions a cattle plague, which has been identified as rinderpest. Another title is Carmen bucolicum de virtute signi crucis domini.

He has been identified with a rhetorician Severus who was a friend of Paulinus of Nola known as Severus Rhetor. He probably lived towards the end of the 4th century.

References 
 Severus Sanctus Endelechus, The Catholic Encyclopedia, Volume XIII.
A. D. Lee, Pagans and Christians in Late Antiquity: A Sourcebook (2000), pp. 130–1.

Notes

External links
CCEL page (Smith dictionary)

Ancient Roman poets
4th-century Latin writers
4th-century Roman poets
Rhetoricians